I'm All Smiles may refer to:
"I'm All Smiles", a song written by Michael Leonard and Herbert Martin for the 1965 Broadway musical The Yearling
I'm All Smiles (Hampton Hawes album), recorded in 1966 and released in 1973 featuring the above
I'm All Smiles (Hank Jones and Tommy Flanagan album), recorded in 1983 featuring the above